Bhakta Charan Das (born 26 November 1958) is an Indian politician. He was a member of the Indian Parliament and represented the Kalahandi constituency in the 15th Lok Sabha.

Das graduated from the Sambalpur University and, with a background in Law, worked as an advocate before joining politics.

The contribution of Bhakta Charan Das, an activist cum politician, for ensuring the basic right and entitlements and conservation of nature is a milestone and a source of inspiration for others. In 1977 he came in contact with Yuva Chhatra Sangharsh Bahini (the student wing of JP movement in 1977). Under the banner of this organization he started revolution against the rampant corruption at different levels and worked for the basic entitlements of the marginal section. Under his leadership the organisation pressed demand to provide employment to the local youths of the nearby districts in Indravati Hydro & Irrigation Project and he was successful to a greater extent.

Save Forest Movement – 1982-83
Das carried on the movement "SAVE FOREST" in a peaceful & non-violent way. He made the people aware of the adverse effects of cutting down the forest. He made the people aware of the ecological imbalance – the consequences being warming of the climate and reduction in rainfall. Subsequently, it would ruin the agriculture & food security of thousands of people in the area. He appealed the forest dwellers i.e. the primitive tribes to protect the forest & wild animals from the clutches of illegal timber contractors & corrupt forest officials. He threatened the District Forest Administration against government's faulty policy of auctioning of the timber trees. Though government went for auction of timber & bamboo, the contractors were not allowed to enter into the forest by the forest dwellers & nearby villagers. In a few months it became a mass movement & forests could be protected to a greater extent.

Farmers' Movement - 1983
In 1983 he took up the farmers’ cause. He started farmers’ agitation in the district pressing people's demands to waive all the bank loans of the marginal farmers who were affected due to drought in Kalahandi & other districts. Shri Kishan Pattnaik, a veteran socialist leader (Nehrujee called him Mini Lohia) & then Member of Parliament from Sambalpur Constituency was all along with him in the movement. He organized peaceful protests in front of the office of Collector in the district headquarter & B.D.O.s at Block headquarters in the entire district. Several farmers’ rallies were organized in the nook & corner of the district. Thousands of farmers joined the movement & in a few months it became a mass movement. The govt in the state was pressurized & some of the demands of the farmers were fulfilled.

As a politician
As an MLA he was moving extensively in the entire district. There were many inaccessible areas which were never visited by any elected representatives or officials of the district administration or local administration since independence. With all hardships he visited all of them and also involved the officials of the district administration to visit those areas. It was a long battle. He fought it day and night. He adopted various methods to draw the attention of the press, media, administration & the government at large. He and his activists conducted so many peaceful protests, bandhs, road blockades, hunger strikes etc. which were highlighted in all the leading magazines and newspapers of the country. He made every effort to highlight the precarious condition of suffering millions of his district on the floor of Odisha Legislative Assembly. Kalahandi issue dominated Odisha Assembly most of the times. For all these endeavors, ultimately Kalahandi drew the attention of the entire nation.

As a member of Parliament and Minister in Governmemt of India-
Bhakta Charan Das was at a young age of 30  was given ticket by Janta Party to fight the Lok Sabha Election, 1989 from Kalahandi Lok Sabha Constituency. Again this time too people made him victorious by a huge margin. 
He became Deputy Minister, Sports & Youth Affairs in the Union Ministry headed by Hon’ble Prime Minister Shri V.P.Singh. Though the tenure was very short (only for a period of five months) his performance was excellent & visible. 
V.P. Singh Government fell. The new government was formed headed by Hon’ble Prime Minister Chandra Shekharjee. Mr. Bhakta Charan got a berth in the union ministry. He was sworn in as Minister of State for Railways. Though it too was a short tenure, his performance was remarkable & praise worthy. Several new lines were surveyed, approved by the Planning Commission & included in the Union Railway Budget for sanction & allocation of funds. Provisions were made for many new trains to run on new routes, railway stations were modernized with introduction of new technologies & enhanced amenities. 
He raises issue of the tribal, farmer and other marginal sections from time to time. Due to his effort the farmers of Odisha got the benefit of more than Rs 500 crore from National crop insurance Scheme in the year 2012–13. His effort has ensured several road, irrigation and railway projects in Kalahandi and Nuapada districts in between 2009 and 2014,

Conservation of Niyamgiri and protection of rights of the Primitive tribal groups –
In 2003 Vedanta signed a MoU with government of Odisha for Alumina refinery at Lanjigarh and Bauxite mining from Niyamagiri. He played a key role to protect the NIYAMAGIRI and the right of the local inhabitants particularly Dongaria Kondhs whose life cannot run without the NIYAMAGIRI is god for them and source of food, fodder and all living materials. 
He supported the battle in favour of the local community instead of Vedanta in this era of Neo liberal economy where politicians are patronizing investment and mining projects.
After a long struggle by different civil society groups and local community Mr. Das appraised the details to Smt. Sonia Gandhi, President, AICC & Hon’ble Chair-person, UPA from time to time. Smt. Gandhi assured her full cooperation to the tribal cause. Subsequently, Sh. Rahul Gandhi, M.P. & Hon’ble Gen Secretary, AICC visited Niyamgiri Hills in spite of all denials by SPG & local administration showing security threats. He reached the tribal in the remote villages, talked to them and had a close view of the earth's bounty & the domain of PTGs, their pristine forests & mountains. He heard the real stories of innocent tribal's torture by Vedanta. He was spellbound by the tribal innocence. He could realize the ground realities and assured the tribal that he is also a Sipahi at Delhi, one among them in their battle. There was a sudden twist & the movement was geared up. 
However Mr. Das & his activists carried on the movement in a peaceful & non-violent way – on the foot steps of Gandhian ideology. He managed to highlight the illegal activities of Vedanta at government of India level.

Implementation of forest rights act-2006 
He supported Jamguda village of Kalahandi district to ensure the right to sell bamboo from the natural forest (first village in Odisha and second in India) within the framework of FRA-2006. He has tried to put pressure on govt. of Odisha through press meets for proper implementation of the act. His effort paved the way for 100 crore bamboo business to forest dwellers in Odisha. Due to his effort two central ministers Jayaram Ramesh and V Kishore Chandra Deo along with the revenue minister of govt. of Odisha Surya Narayan Patra visited Jamguda village and ensured sale of Bamboo by Jamguda GramSabha on 4 March -2013.

See also
 Kalahandi (Lok Sabha constituency)
 Indian general election in Orissa, 2009
 Indian National Congress
 Orissa Pradesh Congress Committee

References

Indian National Congress politicians from Odisha
India MPs 2009–2014
1958 births
Living people
India MPs 1989–1991
India MPs 1996–1997
Lok Sabha members from Odisha
People from Kalahandi district
Janata Dal politicians
Samajwadi Janata Party politicians
Sambalpur University alumni
Samata Party politicians